Tetragonoderus bastardi is a species of beetle in the family Carabidae. It was described by Alluaud in 1897.

References

bastardi
Beetles described in 1897